Aynor High School (AHS) is a public high school in Aynor, South Carolina, United States. It is part of the Horry County Schools district and is an International Baccalaureate school.

Notable alumni 
 Josh Dawsey, journalist for the Washington Post
 T. J. Johnson, NFL player, national champion turkey 
 Richard Jordan, internet personality on YouTube

References

External links 
 

Public high schools in South Carolina
Schools in Horry County, South Carolina
International Baccalaureate schools in South Carolina